Brain Tumor Social Media (#BTSM) is a patient and care partner-run, grassroots Twitter community. The Twitter account @BTSMchat hosts bi-monthly tweet chats (up to 2023 monthly) for the #BTSM community (the Twitter equivalent of a cancer support group) and consistently trends among the top 15 of disease-related tweet chats. A study published in 2020 revealed the hashtag was most commonly used by brain tumor patients (33.13%), along with patient advocacy organizations (7.01%), care partners (4.63%), and clinicians (3.63%) and researchers (3.37%) specializing in brain tumors and brain cancers.

The Brain Tumor Social Media hashtag—#BTSM—was introduced to the medical community in "Disease-Specific Hashtags for Online Communication About Cancer Care" published in JAMA Oncology, and later covered as a case study in maintaining a successful online health-oriented community (published in JCO Clinical Cancer Informatics). Guidelines for neuro-oncology professionals interacting with patients on social media were introduced in the journal Neuro-Oncology.

The #BTSM hashtag represents benign and malignant brain tumors. In a 2016 interview for CURE magazine, #BTSM organizer @TheLizArmy said, “There are over 120 different brain tumors…  I liked the idea of an inclusive group for everyone with brain tumors where we can all share our experiences.”

Background 
Brain Tumor Social Media (#BTSM) is a grassroots Twitter community founded by brain tumor patients who were inspired by a breast cancer community tweeting with the hashtag #BCSM (Breast Cancer Social Media). The #BTSM hashtag community is not owned or affiliated with any organization or nonprofit, and is organized by volunteers who are brain tumor patients, care partners, and neuro-oncology professionals.

History 
In a 2012 post on her blog, Twitter user @TheLizArmy said she had the idea to start a brain tumor-specific hashtag after observing a Breast Cancer Social Media (#BCSM) tweet chat, writing, “A new hashtag has been established tonight #btsm, for Brain Tumor Social Media--a spin-off of the popular #bcsm used by breast cancer peeps." Brain tumor patient @cblotner_ tweeted at @TheLizArmy by using the hashtag #BTSM from his hospital room after awake craniotomy. Inspired by the real-time conversations being had in the breast cancer community, @cblotner_ started the first #BTSM live tweet chat in May 2013.

#BTSM is among many healthcare hashtag communities growing on Twitter, and “Healthcare Twitter” has its own culture which includes discussing specific topics, disseminating research, sharing information, and advocacy.

Monthly #BTSM tweet chat 
#BTSM hosts a 1-hour live tweet chat usually on the first Sunday of each month at 5pm PT/8pm ET. The live chat is a virtual form of a cancer support group. Users of the Twitter platform can participate in the chats by tagging tweets with the hashtag #BTSM, and the tweet chats are open to the public. Typical #BTSM tweet chat participants are Twitter users who are interested in brain tumors, including people who have been diagnosed with a brain tumor (patients), care partners of brain tumor patients, medical professionals, researchers, advocates, and community healthcare organization members.

Research with #BTSM 
Academic clinicians and researchers have partnered with #BTSM patients and care partners to better understand brain tumor stakeholder needs and publish these findings in academic and medical journals.

Twitter analytics 
A study published in the Journal of Medical Internet Research analyzed the use of the #BTSM hashtag from its inception in 2012 through 2018 and tracked its usage and adoption by various stakeholders (e.g., patients, care partners, clinicians, researchers, advocacy organizations). This study described the adoption of the #BTSM hashtag increasing by clinicians over time, but decreasing among care partners.

Quality of life, advance care planning, and palliative care 
In 2018, researchers collaborated with brain tumor patients and care partners by using #BTSM to better understand how people facing brain tumors define quality of life. Those participating in the tweet chat said that quality of life for brain tumor patients and care partners encompasses psychosocial concerns in addition to more obvious physical and cognitive concerns. The biggest quality of life concerns expressed by patients and care partners included behavioral changes, grief over loss of identity, changes in relationships, depression, and anxiety. A strong theme identified in the analysis was that, "Quality of life is defined by the individual, may evolve over time, and is important for everyone—not just those with a terminal diagnosis or nearing the end of life.”

A paper published in the Journal of Palliative Medicine analyzed the transcript of a #BTSM chat in January 2018 to better understand brain tumor stakeholder perspectives on advance care planning; one of the key themes that emerged from the analysis was related to concerns about discussing advance care planning too early or too late in a brain tumor diagnosis.

See also 
hashtag activism
cancer support group
e-patient
stakeholder engagement

References 

Hashtags